Vrh pri Mlinšah is a settlement west of Mlinše in the Municipality of Zagorje ob Savi in central Slovenia. The area is part of the traditional region of Upper Carniola. It is now included with the rest of the municipality in the Central Sava Statistical Region.

Name
The name of the settlement was changed from Vrh to Vrh pri Mlinšah in 1955.

References

External links

Vrh pri Mlinšah on Geopedia

Populated places in the Municipality of Zagorje ob Savi